Akkarayan (Tamil: அக்கராயன்) was one of the Tamil chiefs of Vanni Nadu, who ruled over Akkarayan region around 13th century. He was credited for building the Akkarayan Kulam in Kilinochchi. 2018, was a statue of king Akkarayan opened in Kilinochchi.

See also
Vanniar (Chieftain)
List of Tamil monarchs

References

Sri Lankan Tamil royalty
Tamil monarchs
Sri Lankan Hindus